Jameh Mosque of Farumad is one of the oldest buildings in the Farumad in the Shahrud County. This mosque is related to the seventh century Islamic calendar.

References

Mosques in Iran
Mosque buildings with domes
National works of Iran
Farumad